Angel Beside Me (Angel Beside Me – ) is a 2020 Thai television series starring Krissanapoom Pibulsonggram (JJ) and Ramida Jiranorraphat (Jane).

Directed by Chatkaew Susiwa and produced by GMMTV, the series was one of the thirteen television series launched by GMMTV in their "Wonder Th13teen" event on 5 November 2018. Originally scheduled for 2019 release, it premiered on GMM 25 and LINE TV on 18 January 2020, airing on Saturdays at 21:30 ICT and 23:00 ICT, respectively. The series concluded on 4 April 2020.

Cast and characters 
Below are the cast of the series:

Main 
 Krissanapoom Pibulsonggram (JJ) as Mikael Lansaladon Aekisna Ares/Somchai
 Ramida Jiranorraphat (Jane) as Lin

Supporting 
 Pongkool Suebsung as Thong
 Jirakit Thawornwong (Mek) as Luke
 Juthapich Inn-Chan (Jamie) as Punpun
 Gornpop Janjaroen (Joke) as Stephen Shepherd (Police Angel)
 Sumonrat Wattanaselarat as Rarin
 Phatchara Tubthong (Kapook) as Dujao
 Worranit Thawornwong (Mook) as Serena
 Pattadon Janngeon (Fiat) as Gabriel (Angel)
 Patrick Nattawat Finkler as Cupid

Guest role 
 Pronpiphat Pattanasettanon (Plustor) as Guardian Angel
 Niti Chaichitathorn (Pompam) as Lord of Angels
 Napasorn Weerayuttvilai (Puimek) as Angel of Love
 Purim Rattanaruangwattana (Pluem) as Angel
 Harit Cheewagaroon (Sing)
 Chanagun Arpornsutinan (Gunsmile) as Munggorn
 Rachanun Mahawan (Film) as Baitoey

Soundtrack

References

External links 
 Angel Beside Me on GMM 25 website 
 Angel Beside Me on LINE TV
 GMMTV

Television series by GMMTV
Thai romantic comedy television series
2020 Thai television series debuts
2020 Thai television series endings
GMM 25 original programming
Thai romantic fantasy television series